See What I Say is a 1981 American short documentary film produced by Linda Chapman, Pam LeBlanc and Freddi Stevens. It was nominated for an Academy Award for Best Documentary Short. The subjects of the film are hearing-impaired women who discuss their use of sign language. Also included are the singer-songwriter Holly Near and her concert sign language interpreter.

Reception
A reviewer for Choice wrote: "The beauty in both the technical aspects and the content is that there is a feeling of cooperation, community, and sharing among all those who participated in the making of the film."

See also
List of films featuring the deaf and hard of hearing

References

External links

1981 films
1981 documentary films
1981 short films
American short documentary films
American independent films
American Sign Language films
Documentary films about deaf people
Documentary films about women
1980s short documentary films
1981 independent films
1980s English-language films
1980s American films